The Island of Montreal is a large island in southwestern Quebec, Canada, that is the site of a number of municipalities including most of the city of Montreal and is the most populous island in Canada. It is the main island of the Hochelaga Archipelago at the confluence of the Saint Lawrence and Ottawa rivers.

Name 

The first French name for the island was l'ille de Vilmenon, noted by Samuel de Champlain in a 1616 map, and derived from the sieur de Vilmenon, a patron of the founders of Quebec at the court of Louis XIII. However, by 1632 Champlain referred to the Isle de Mont-real in another map. The island derived its name from Mount Royal (French Mont Royal, then pronounced ), and gradually spread its name to the town, which had originally been called Ville-Marie.

In Kanien’kéha, the island is called Tiohtià:ke tsi ionhwéntsare ('broken in two', referring to the Lachine Rapids to the island's southwest) or Otsirà:ke (meaning 'on the fire'). In Anishninaabemowin, the land is called Mooniyaang, named for the first stop in the great Anishinaabe migration from Dawnland (the Maritimes) to the Great Lakes.

Physical geography
The island is approximately 50 km (30 miles) long and 16 km (10 miles) wide at its widest point, and has a shoreline of 266 km (165 miles). It is the second largest island in the Saint Lawrence River, after Anticosti Island in the Gulf of Saint Lawrence. The Island of Montreal is the largest island in the Hochelaga Archipelago, which is formed by the confluence of the Ottawa and St. Lawrence rivers.

Near the Ottawa shore at the western end of island, the Ottawa River widens into Lac des Deux-Montagnes. A natural watercourse there, between the island and Île Perrot, has been improved by the island's Sainte-Anne-de-Bellevue Canal. These waterways, connecting Lac des Deux-Montagnes with Lake Saint-Louis, constitute one of the places where the Ottawa flows into the St. Lawrence.

North of the island's western end, Lac des Deux-Montagnes flows into Rivière des Prairies, still part of the Ottawa.  The Prairies separates the island from the other major part of the Hochelaga Archipelago including Île Bizard and Île Jésus. After coursing about 55 km (35 miles), the Prairie, at the northeastern tip of the island, joins the St. Lawrence.

The St. Lawrence coast of the island faces a variable waterway. In the southwest, the St. Lawrence River widens into Lake Saint-Louis as it approaches the island. Around a southern point near the center of the island, the St. Lawrence narrows into the Lachine Rapids, then widens into the Bassin de La Prairie past that southern point, and narrows again at the Montreal neighborhood of Cite Du Havre before flowing towards Quebec City and the Atlantic Ocean.  The Lachine Canal on the island bypasses this complex part of the river. Neighboring islands in the St. Lawrence include Saint Helen's Island, Notre Dame Island, and Nuns' Island.

 The topography of the island has been significantly altered by human activity, as evidenced by historical maps that name a lake St. Pierre in the island.  This lake, and several other watercourses, have been drained or covered over as the city developed, while areas on the island's shores have been reclaimed and extended. The southwest of the island is separated by the Lachine Canal between Lachine and Montreal's Old Port; this portion of the island is partially divided further by the Canal de l'Aqueduc, running roughly parallel to the Lachine Canal, beginning in the borough of LaSalle and continuing between the boroughs of Le Sud-Ouest and Verdun.

Most of the bedrock of the island consists of Chazy limestone, with some Utica shale. At the centre of the island stand the three peaks of Mount Royal, a volcanic intrusion (not an extinct volcano, contrary to popular belief). This short mountain (elevation 233 metres, 765') is a member of, and gives its name to, the Monteregian Hills.

Human geography

The island of Montreal is the major component of the territory of the city of Montreal, along with Île Bizard, Saint Helen's Island, Notre Dame Island, Nuns' Island, and some 69 smaller islands. With a population of 2,014,221 inhabitants (22% of the population of Québec), it is by far the most populous island in Canada.  It is also the 6th most populous island of the Americas and the 37th most populated island on Earth.  In addition, it is the world's most populous island surrounded by fresh water. Montreal and the other municipalities on the island compose the administrative region of Montréal. The area of the Urban agglomeration of Montreal, which includes the Island of Montreal and several other smaller islands, is 499 km2 (193 sq. mi.).

The crossings which connect the island to its surroundings are some of the busiest bridges in the country and the world. The Champlain Bridge and the Jacques Cartier Bridge together accommodate 101 million vehicle crossings a year.

Municipalities

Baie-d'Urfé
Beaconsfield
Côte-Saint-Luc
Dollard-des-Ormeaux
Dorval
Dorval Island
Hampstead
Kirkland
Montreal
Montréal-Est
Montréal-Ouest
Mount Royal
Pointe-Claire
Sainte-Anne-de-Bellevue
Senneville
Westmount

Demographics

See also
 List of islands of Quebec
 List of rivers and water bodies of Montreal Island

Note

References

Further reading

 Adams, Frank D., and O. E. LeRoy. The Artesian and Other Deep Wells on the Island of Montreal. Montreal: [s.n.], 1906. 
 Bosworth, Newton. Hochelaga Depicta The Early History and Present State of the City and Island of Montreal. Toronto: Coles Pub. Co, 1974. (Table of Contents)
 Fisher, John. Memorial in Support of the Petition of the Inhabitants and Proprietors of the City and Island of Montreal Praying That the Ecclesiastics of St. Sulpice May Not Be Constituted a Body Corporate and Ecclesiastical, and Their Title Confirmed to Certain Valuable Seigniories and Estates. Montreal?: s.n, 1840. 
 Mackay, Murdo. The Language Problem and School Board Reform on the Island of Montreal. Ottawa: National Library of Canada, 1988. 
 Parks Canada. Montréal, a City Steeped in History Guide to Nationality Significant Places, Persons and Events on the Island of Montréal. Québec: Parks Canada, 2004. 
 Russell, Ken. Metropolitan Government on the Island of Montreal. Toronto: Osgoode Hall Law School, 1972.
 Sancton, Andrew. Governing the Island of Montreal Language Differences and Metropolitan Politics. Lane studies in regional government. Berkeley: University of California Press, 1985. 
 Savoie, Josée. Neighbourhood Characteristics and the Distribution of Crime on the Island of Montréal. Crime and justice research paper series, no. 007. Ottawa: Statistics Canada, 2006. 
 Stansfield, John. The Pleistocene and Recent Deposits of the Island of Montreal. Ottawa: Government Printing Bureau, 1915.

External links
 Flags and Coats of Arms
Municipalities of Montreal Island - City of Montreal

Hochelaga Archipelago
River islands of Quebec
Landforms of Montreal